In Greek mythology, Epidotes (Ancient Greek: Ἐπιδώτης) was a divinity who was worshipped at Lacedaemon, and averted the anger of Zeus Hicesius for the crime committed by the Spartan general Pausanias.

Epidotes, meaning the "liberal giver" or "bountiful", occurs also as an epithet of other divinities, such as Zeus at Mantineia and Sparta, and of Hypnos and Oneiros at Sicyon, who had a statue in the temple of Asclepius there, which represented them in the act of sending a lion to sleep, and lastly of the beneficent gods, to whom a second-century senator, Antoninus, built a sanctuary at Epidaurus.

Notes

References 

 Pausanias, Description of Greece with an English Translation by W.H.S. Jones, Litt.D., and H.A. Ormerod, M.A., in 4 Volumes. Cambridge, MA, Harvard University Press; London, William Heinemann Ltd. 1918. . Online version at the Perseus Digital Library
 Pausanias, Graeciae Descriptio. 3 vols. Leipzig, Teubner. 1903.  Greek text available at the Perseus Digital Library.

Greek gods
Religion in ancient Sparta
Epithets of Zeus
Achaia (Roman province)
Sicyon
Asclepius